Sigrid van Aken (Amsterdam, March 1, 1970) is the Chief Executive Officer of Novamedia / Postcode Lottery Group.

Early life and career 
Sigrid studied French Language and Literature at the University of Utrecht. She joined Rabobank Paris in 1994. In 1998, she became senior IT consultant for KPMG Consulting.

In 2002, Sigrid joined Nationale Postcode Loterij, a lottery of Novamedia / Postcode Lottery Group. After being active in various roles for the lottery, she took over the role as CEO of Novamedia / Postcode Lottery Group from Boudewijn Poelmann in 2020, and is thus responsible for all entities and operations of the Postcode Lotteries in five countries.

In 2020, she made it to the 59th position of Volkskrant Top 200, the list of most influential Dutch people.

References

Chief executive officers